Luboš Pecka (born 19 February 1978 in Prachatice) is a retired Czech footballer. He was a striker or attacking midfielder.

Biography 
Pecka first began his youth career with FK Lažiště and Tatran Prachatice. His first team came with a brief spell at SK České Budějovice (2000–2001) before returning to Tatran Prachatice (2001–2004). He then move to Czech top flight club FK Mladá Boleslav. In his first season, he scored three times in 16 games (2004–05). His next season was big improvement because he scored nine in 25 games (2005–06). The next season, he was top scorer of the Gambrinus liga with 16 in 29 (2006–07). This earned him a loan move to Alemannia Aachen.

He has been called up to the Czech Republic senior side although he did not make his debut.

References

External links 

1978 births
Living people
Czech footballers
Association football forwards
Czech First League players
2. Bundesliga players
Alemannia Aachen players
SK Dynamo České Budějovice players
FC Silon Táborsko players
FK Mladá Boleslav players
Czech expatriate footballers
Expatriate footballers in Germany
People from Prachatice
Czech expatriate sportspeople in Germany
Sportspeople from the South Bohemian Region